Joanne McTaggart (born 29 November 1954) is a Canadian sprinter. She competed in the women's 200 metres at the 1976 Summer Olympics. She won a gold medal in the 1975 Pan American Games 4 × 400 metres relay (with Joyce Sadowick, Margaret McGowen and Rachelle Campbell) and a bronze medal in the 1975 Pan American Games 4 × 100 metres relay (with Marjorie Bailey, Joyce Sadowick and Patty Loverock).

References

1954 births
Living people
Athletes (track and field) at the 1976 Summer Olympics
Canadian female sprinters
Olympic track and field athletes of Canada
Athletes (track and field) at the 1975 Pan American Games
Pan American Games gold medalists for Canada
Pan American Games bronze medalists for Canada
Pan American Games medalists in athletics (track and field)
Athletes from Regina, Saskatchewan
Medalists at the 1975 Pan American Games
Olympic female sprinters